MotoGP 3 (often stylized as MotoGP3) is a Grand Prix motorcycle racing video game developed and published by Namco for the PlayStation 2. Released in 2003, it is the third game in the Namco series, which coincided with the THQ series for a number of years.

Gameplay 
The gameplay is very similar to past games by Namco, like MotoGP (PS2) and MotoGP 2. MotoGP 3 is based on the 2002 Grand Prix motorcycle racing season, but with the introduction of four stroke bikes, the gameplay has some slight differences. The new 990cc 4-stroke bikes are faster but harder to handle, while the 500cc 2-strokes are slower but slightly better to handle.

Features 
MotoGP 3 has far more tracks than the previous game, with 15 real world courses which include Phillip Island Grand Prix Circuit, Paul Ricard, Motegi and Mugello. There are also a combination of fantasy layouts. When starting the game up for the first time, players can create a custom rider. After that, they will be brought to the menu screen where they can access a number of options. The first is arcade, where the players can choose the bike they wish to ride, number of laps, weather, difficulty and settings to do a race. Season mode puts them into a season with any team (depending on difficulty) and the player races on a combination of circuits to try and win the championship. Time Trial is like Arcade, except that rather than racing against a number of opponents for a number of laps, the player races against the clock to try to get the best time for as long as desired. Challenge mode is a series of challenges that players can play. They range from beating another rider, riding between cones, setting a specific lap time in Time Trial or winning a race at a specific track. Completing challenges will unlock riders, movies and pictures. Multiplayer allows players to race against up to four other people. Legends mode is, like Time Trial, similar to Arcade mode, except rather than facing riders from 2002, they face riders from past seasons, including the likes of Kevin Schwantz, Wayne Gardner and Mick Doohan to name a few.

Riders

2002

Legends

Fantasy 
The game also includes fictional riders based on Namco game franchises. Susumu Hori is only available in the PAL and Japanese version of the game.

Circuits
The game features 15 circuits based on the 2002 season of MotoGP.

Reception 

The game received "favorable" reviews according to the review aggregation website Metacritic. MotoGP 3 was successful in Italy: Sony Computer Entertainment Italia reported just under 100,000 sales by March 2004.

References

External links 
 

2003 video games
Grand Prix motorcycle racing video games
Racing video games
Namco games
PlayStation 2 games
PlayStation 2-only games
Grand Prix motorcycle racing
Video games developed in Japan
Video games set in Australia
Video games set in the Czech Republic
Video games set in England
Video games set in France
Video games set in Germany
Video games set in Italy
Video games set in Japan
Video games set in Malaysia
Video games set in the Netherlands
Video games set in Spain
Video games set in Portugal